Lazar Krestin (10 September 1868, Kaunas – 28 February 1938, Vienna) was an artist famous in the German art world for Judaic genre scenes and his many sober portraits of Eastern European Jews. He was also a noted Zionist.

His father was a Talmud teacher. His first lessons were at the drawing school in Vilnius, followed by studies at the Academy of Fine Arts, Vienna and the Academy of Fine Arts, Munich and he was one of the most prominent students of Isidor Kaufmann. He worked in Munich, Vienna and Odessa before going to Jerusalem in 1910 at the request of Bezalel Academy of Arts and Design founder, Boris Schatz. He later returned to Vienna and is buried in the Zentralfriedhof.

Sources 
 *Österreichisches Biographisches Lexikon 1815–1950, Bd. 4 (Lfg. 18, 1968), S. 262.

External links

ArtNet: More works by Krestin.
Works by Krestin @ the Musée d'art et d'histoire du Judaïsme
Works by Krestin @ the Jewish Museum, Berlin

1868 births
1938 deaths
19th-century Lithuanian painters
20th-century Lithuanian painters
Jewish painters
Lithuanian Jews
Austrian Jews
Austrian people of Lithuanian descent
Artists from Kaunas